The  Knebworth and Winter Green Railway was a  narrow gauge railway built in the grounds of Knebworth House in 1972 as a tourist attraction.

The railway was built by Pleasurerail Ltd. a company set up to build and operate private tourist railways which included the Great Whipsnade Railway and also the line at Blenheim Palace. In 1971, they started construction on a railway in the grounds of Knebworth House near Stevenage. The initial line was an end-to-end layout running from the house to the adventure playground. In 1980, the track was extended to form a mile-long continuous loop.

During its existence, the line hosted a number of steam and diesel locomotives. The line continued to run until 1990 when it was lifted and the remaining stock transferred to other lines

Locomotives 

These are the locomotives that stayed at Knebworth for extended periods. Not all ran there at the same time and the exact dates when they were present are not always known.

References

See also
 British narrow gauge railways

1 ft 11½ in gauge railways in England
Rail transport in Hertfordshire